The Bird Store is a Silly Symphonies animated Disney short film. It was released on January 16, 1932, by Columbia Pictures. The cartoon marks the first recorded voice work of Clarence Nash (the original voice of Donald Duck) for Walt Disney Productions, and it was also the final cartoon in the Silly Symphonies series to be released by Columbia Pictures.

Plot
A pet shop specializing in birds. The various caged birds chirp along to the score in their various styles (including a set of birds that look like the Marx Brothers). A cat eyes the proceedings hungrily and makes his way in through an open transom, causing panic and an organized counterattack. The cat then becomes trapped in the cage as the birds throw the cat out and his cage lands on a flag pole in the middle of the city dog pound.

Voice cast
Purv Pullen, Clarence Nash, Marion Darlington: Bird warbles and whistling
Clarence Nash: Cat
Pinto Colvig And Clarence Nash: Dogs Barking
Walt Disney: Parrot
Marcellite Garner: Lady On Phone

Home media
The short was released on December 19, 2006, on Walt Disney Treasures: More Silly Symphonies, Volume Two.

References

External links

1932 films
1932 animated films
1932 short films
American animated short films
American black-and-white films
Animated films about birds
Animated films about cats
Columbia Pictures short films
Columbia Pictures animated short films
1930s Disney animated short films
Films directed by Wilfred Jackson
Films produced by Walt Disney
Animated films without speech
Silly Symphonies
1930s American films